Jakub Podrazil (born 9 January 1992) is a Czech rower. He competed in the men's coxless pair event at the 2016 Summer Olympics.

References

External links
 

1992 births
Living people
Czech male rowers
Olympic rowers of the Czech Republic
Rowers at the 2012 Summer Olympics
Rowers at the 2016 Summer Olympics
Rowers at the 2020 Summer Olympics
Rowers from Prague
European Rowing Championships medalists